The WSR-1 or Weather Surveillance Radar-1 was one of the first weather radars and the first used by a civilian organization in the US.  The WSR-1 series was a modified version of the AN/APS-2F radar, which the Weather Bureau (now the National Weather Service) acquired from the Navy.  The WSR-1A, WSR-3, and WSR-4 were also variants of this radar.  The first WSR-1 in the USA was at Washington National Airport in Washington, D.C. in 1947, and the last WSR-3 was retired by 1978.

History 

In 1946, the US Weather Bureau (ancestor of the National Weather Service) retrieved 25 AN/APS-2F aeronautical radars from the US Navy. The radars have been modified and adapted to meteorology and then delivered at the rate of five per year. The modifications were conducted by the weather service and the modified radars took the successive names of WSR-1, WSR-1A, WSR-3 and WSR-4, depending on the gradual improvement of hardware. The first WSR-1 was put into service at the Washington, DC, national airport on March 12, 1947. The second began service on June 1, 1947 in Wichita, Kansas, in the heart of the Tornado Alley. In August of the same year, the  WSR-1 installed at  Norfolk, Nebraska proved its usefulness and cost savings by alerting the  Elkhorn  Valley  power  system of the approach of thunderstorms.

Three particularly severe weather events occurred during the spring of 1953 and led to the establishment of the Texas Tornado Warning Network. Major cities in Texas have been asked to fund the operation (both the private and public sectors) of modifying and implementing the WSR-1, WSR-1A, WSR-3 and WSR-4. The Weather Bureau agreed to operate these radars and maintain them in order to alert the public in case of danger, as soon as a visual confirmation was obtained. The establishment of the network became effective during a kick-off meeting on June 24, 1953. It took nearly six years for the network to be fully operational; 17 radars have been modified and installed thanks to the joint efforts of local authorities, the state, federal agencies and a university.

The APS-2F modified by Texas A & M University, although not actually part of the tornado surveillance network, was at least once used for warning purposes on April 5, 1956. After 1956 the modification of the APS-2F radars in their WSR-1, WSR-1A, WSR-3 and WSR-4 versions was assigned to the Weather Office headquarters which had to move some antennas that had originally been installed to locations where it was difficult to ensure the maintenance.

In April 1975, at the peak of the program, 82 WSR-1, WSR-1A, WSR-3 and WSR-4 were in service. Some were replaced by WSR-57s, but most remained in service until they were replaced by WSR-74s during a period from 1976 to 1980. No more remains in service today.

Characteristics 

The WSR-1 to 4 series, the first operational weather radar in the United States, used the AN/APS-2F electronics, including a superheterodyne receiver, but with a larger antenna. As time progressed and experience with the original design increased, the Weather Bureau felt confident enough to upgrade the WSR-1 to WSR-1A, eventually finalizing on the WSR-3 and WSR-4 model. The WSR-4 upgrades included the removal of the original aircraft-oriented antenna in favor of a larger antenna, and the addition of a power converter such that it would now have the ability to function on conventional power.

The main difference between the versions was their display and the control of the probed atmospheric volume. The diameter of the dish was nearly 2 meters by the WSR-4. The wavelength used was about 10 cm which corresponds to a frequency of 3 GHz. This frequency is in the S band which is still used by the current US weather radar network. Thanks to the radars operative frequency, the attenuation due to the rain was almost zero, but the detection of a light rain or snow was delicate because of the weakness of the signal emitted by the radar (50 kW).

The WSR-1 used a panoramic display (PPI) placing weather echoes in azimuth/distance coordinates on a circular screen whose center represented the position of the radar, and also a linear oscilloscope (A-Scope) showing the intensity of the echoes according to their distance from the radar. Everything was mounted on a rack. The WSR-3 and WSR-4 used A-Scope displays and height/distance displays (RHI) which allows a vertical sectional view in a chosen direction. They were mounted next to each other on a console. The WSR-1A used the same displays but stacked vertically. From a technical point of view, the WSR-4 had a traveling-wave tube that improved the sensitivity compared to the WSR-3.

Radar Sites

The 82 radar sites of WSR1, 1A, 3 and 4 are listed below

References

National Weather Service weather radars